Mitochondrial import receptor subunit TOM22 homolog is a protein that in humans is encoded by the TOMM22 gene.

The protein encoded by this gene is an integral membrane protein of the mitochondrial outer membrane. The encoded protein interacts with TOMM20 and TOMM40, and forms a complex with several other proteins to import cytosolic preproteins into the mitochondrion.

See also
 Mitochondria Outer Membrane Translocase
 TOMM20
 TOMM40
 TOMM70A

References

Further reading